is a tiny near-Earth asteroid and fast rotator with a diameter of approximately 2–3 meters that ordinarily orbits the Sun but makes close approaches to the Earth–Moon system around every twenty years, when it can temporarily enter Earth orbit through temporary satellite capture (TSC). As a consequence of its temporary orbit around the Earth, it is currently the smallest asteroid in the Solar System with a well-known orbit. Until given a minor planet designation on 18 February 2008, the object was known as 6R10DB9, an internal identification number assigned by the Catalina Sky Survey.

Discovery 

 was discovered on 14 September 2006 by Eric Christensen with the  Schmidt camera of the Catalina Sky Survey in Arizona. "6R10DB9" was the Catalina Sky Survey's own discovery designation for this object, which usually would only be used on the MPC's Near-Earth Object Confirmation Page (NEOCP) until an IAU designation was applied, if the object was classified as a minor object. It was added on 14 September to the NEOCP and subsequently removed with the explanation that it "was not a minor planet". Preliminary orbital calculations indicated it was captured by Earth's gravity from solar orbit of a period of about 12 months, which is similar to that of many spent rocket boosters dating to the Apollo program of the 1960s and early 1970s. 6R10DB was assigned the designation  on 18 February 2008.

Origin 

Some controversy existed regarding the origin of the object. Upon discovery, it was not given a formal name because its spectrum was consistent with the white titanium-oxide paint used on Saturn V rockets, which meant it could be an artificial object. Precedents for this exist: J002E3 is currently thought to be the third-stage Saturn S-IVB booster from Apollo 12 and was in an almost identical orbit, and 6Q0B44E, discovered a month earlier, was also thought to be artificial. Its status as a satellite was also debated, with A. W. Harris of the Space Science Institute commenting, "Claiming some bit of fluff in a temporary looping orbit to be a 'satellite', with all the baggage that term carries, is mere hype". Radar observations strongly suggest that the object is a natural body.

Orbit 

Analysis has shown that solar-radiation pressure is perturbing its motion perceptibly. However, Paul Chodas in JPL's Solar System Dynamics Group suspects that the perturbations are consistent with expectations for a rocky object but not with old flight hardware. One hypothesis is that the object is a piece of lunar rock ejected by an impact.

 made four Earth orbits of about three months each with perigee (closest approach to Earth) on 11 September 2006, 3 January 2007, 25 March 2007, and 14 June 2007. During the 12-month capture from July 2006 to July 2007 when it was inside of Earth's hill sphere, it stayed within  of Earth. Though it was outside of Earth's hill sphere, the geocentric orbital eccentricity was not greater than 1 until 17 September 2007.

It is now in solar orbit as an Amor-class asteroid with an orbit completely outside of Earth's orbit. As of 2022, this object is 1.7 AU from Earth on the other side of the Sun and will not be less than 1 AU from Earth until March 2025.

Future events 

2006 RH120 has a 1-in-200 (0.5%) chance of Earth impact on 8 February 2044 and would impact with a harmless 1 kiloton of energy if it did impact. (The Chelyabinsk meteor released about 440 kt of energy.) JPL Horizon's nominal orbit has the asteroid passing  from Earth on 9 January 2044 (30 days before the virtual impactor). As a result of a 281 day observation arc and radar observations, JPL's solution accounts for non-gravitational forces as the multi-decade motion of a very small object is greatly affected by solar heating.

14 June 2007 perigee 

On 14 June 2007,  made its fourth and last perigee of the most recent Earth encounter. It was 0.72 lunar distances at closest, with an apparent magnitude of 18.5–19.0. Astronomers at JPL Goldstone in California made radar astrometry measurements on 12, 14 and 17 June 2007.

 is listed as part of the Near-Earth Object Human Space Flight Accessible Targets Study (NHATS).

See also 
  temporary Earth satellite discovered in 1991
  another temporary Earth satellite discovered in 2020
 6Q0B44E small Earth satellite, probably artificial
 3753 Cruithne horseshoe companion of the Earth
  horseshoe companion of the Earth
  horseshoe companion of the Earth
 Natural satellite 
 Claimed moons of Earth
 Quasi-satellite
 Space debris

References

External links 
 Great Shefford Observatory's 6R10DB9 images and background
 Earth's "Other Moon", Roger W. Sinnott, Sky & Telescope, 17 April 2007
 JPL Radar Astrometry Page
 Bill Gray's Pseudo-MPEC Page on 6R10DB9
 Photometry of 2006 RH120: an asteroid temporarily captured into a geocentric orbit (Astronomy & Astrophysics 2009)
Interactive 3D visualisation of the Earth 2006 RH120 capture event
 
 
 

Minor planet object articles (unnumbered)

Claimed moons of Earth

20060911
20070614
20060914